Sasha Lilley born 1975 is an English-born radio host, writer and journalist based in Oakland, California.

Career
Lilley is the editor of Capital and Its Discontents: Conversations with Radical Thinkers in a Time of Tumult, published by PM Press.  Lilley is a contributor to the Turbulence Collective's What Would it Mean to Win?, a collection of debates about the direction of the Global Justice Movement, published by PM Press. She is the series editor of the political economy imprint Spectre.

Lilley is a co-founder and host of the Pacifica Radio program Against the Grain.  From 2007-2009, she was the interim program director at KPFA. She directed Pacifica Radio’s coverage of the Winter Soldier hearings in Silver Spring, Maryland, launched the War Comes Home, about the human costs of the Iraq and Afghanistan occupations, curated the multimedia project “1968: The Year that Shook the World” commemorating 1968 with archival audio from the Pacifica Radio Archives, and launched the multimedia collaboration “Afghanistan 2008: Seven Years After the Taliban”.

She has overseen national broadcasts, including on torture under the Bush Administration, the testimonials of survivors of Hurricane Katrina, and on the global financial crisis.

Lilley was an editor, staff writer, and researcher at CorpWatch, reporting on the World Bank, labor struggles, and agribusiness.

She has worked as an academic researcher and investigative journalist, including into US contracts in Iraq following the American-led invasion.

Personal
Lilley is married to PM Press and AK Press founder Ramsey Kanaan.

Books
 Lilley, Sasha. Capital and Its Discontents: Conversations with Radical Thinkers in a Time of Tumult PM Press, 2011.
 Turbulence Collective (ed.) What Would it Mean to Win? PM Press, 2010.
 Lilley, Sasha, et al., Catastrophism: The Apocalyptic Politics of Collapse and Rebirth PM Press, 2012.

Misc
 Lilley, Sasha. Theory and Practice: Conversations with Noam Chomsky and Howard Zinn (DVD) PM Press, 2010.

References

External links
 Counterspin, “Interview with Sasha Lilley on the War Comes Home” November 14, 2008
 “Christopher Hitchens and Chris Hedges Debate ‘Is God Great?’ Moderated by Sasha Lilley", May 24, 2007

American radio personalities
Pacifica Foundation people
English radio presenters
English journalists
Marxist writers
Living people
Year of birth missing (living people)